Power to the People: The Hits is a compilation album gathering John Lennon's most popular songs, as part of the Gimme Some Truth box set. It is available as a standard 15-track disc and download package, and as an expanded "Experience Edition" with a 15-track DVD.

Track listing

Charts

Weekly charts

Year-end charts

Certifications

References

2010 greatest hits albums
Compilation albums published posthumously
Capitol Records compilation albums
John Lennon compilation albums